Evil genius may refer to:

Arts and entertainment
 Evil genius, a version of the mad scientist motif in fiction
 Evil Genius (book series), a series of non-fiction books
 Evil Genius (novel), by Catherine Jinks, 2005
 Evil Genius (album), by Gucci Mane, 2018
 "Evil Genius", a song by Pat Benatar from the 1981 album Precious Time 
 Evil Genius (TV series), a 2018 true crime documentary series
 Evil Genius (video game), 2004 
 Evil Geniuses, an esports organisation
 Evil Geniuses: The Unmaking of America, a 2020 nonfiction book by Kurt Andersen

Other uses
 Evil genius, or evil demon, a concept in Cartesian philosophy

See also 
 
 Evil (disambiguation) 
 Genius (disambiguation)
 Crime boss, a person in charge of a criminal organization
 Supervillain, a stock character in superhero fiction